The lilac-crowned fruit dove (Ptilinopus rarotongensis) is a species of bird in the family Columbidae. It is endemic to the Cook Islands.

Its natural habitat is subtropical or tropical moist lowland forests. It is threatened by habitat loss.

Subspecies 
 P. r. rarotongensis Hartlaub & Finsch, 1871 – Rarotonga
 P. r. goodwini Holyoak, 1974 – Atiu

References

lilac-crowned fruit dove
Birds of the Cook Islands
lilac-crowned fruit dove
Taxonomy articles created by Polbot